The 2019 MercedesCup was a men's tennis tournament to be played on outdoor grass courts. It was the 42nd edition of the Stuttgart Open, and part of the ATP Tour 250 series of the 2019 ATP Tour. It was held at the Tennis Club Weissenhof in Stuttgart, Germany, from 10 June until 16 June 2019.

ATP singles main draw entrants

Seeds

1 Rankings are as of May 27, 2019.

Other entrants
The following players received wildcards into the main draw:
  Lucas Pouille
  Alexander Zverev
  Mischa Zverev

The following player received entry using a protected ranking into the main draw:
  Jo-Wilfried Tsonga

The following players received entry from the qualifying draw:
  Dustin Brown
  Viktor Galović
  Feliciano López
  Alexei Popyrin

Withdrawals
Before the tournament
  Pablo Carreño Busta → replaced by  Steve Johnson
  Laslo Đere → replaced by  Peter Gojowczyk
  Stan Wawrinka → replaced by  Miomir Kecmanović

During the tournament
  Milos Raonic

ATP doubles main draw entrants

Seeds

1 Rankings are as of May 27, 2019.

Other entrants
The following pairs received wildcards into the doubles main draw:
  Andre Begemann /  Dustin Brown
  Lucas Pouille /  Jo-Wilfried Tsonga

The following pair received entry as alternates:
  Matteo Berrettini /  Márton Fucsovics

Withdrawals
Before the tournament
  Hubert Hurkacz

Finals

Singles 

  Matteo Berrettini defeated  Félix Auger-Aliassime, 6–4, 7–6(13–11)

Doubles 

  John Peers /  Bruno Soares defeated  Rohan Bopanna /  Denis Shapovalov, 7–5, 6–3

References

External links 
 
 ATP tournament profile

Stuttgart Open
Stuttgart Open
2019 in German tennis
MercedesCup